Trombi may mean:
 Trombi (roller coaster), a roller coaster located at Särkänniemi in Tampere
 Trombi.com, a social network owned by Classmates.com